Albany Lakes Civic Park is a public park located in Albany, New Zealand, a suburb of Auckland. It is adjacent to the Westfield Albany shopping mall, in the centre of a new commercial/town centre area that is being developed.

The park comprises two artificial lakes that serve both as landscape features and stormwater ponds. The lakes were created in the late 2000s, though the park took somewhat longer to finish, and much of the new vegetation is still in the process of growing in as of 2010.

Providing an assembly/grassland area allowing up to 10,000 people to the north of the lakes, the park was designated as one of the 'fan zones' for the Rugby World Cup 2011.

References

External links

 Albany Lakes Summer Series (running events)

Lakes of the Auckland Region
Parks in the Auckland Region
Artificial lakes